Magnolia Hotel may refer to:

 Magnolia Hotel (Biloxi, Mississippi), listed on the NRHP in Harrison County, Mississippi
 Magnolia Hotel (Dallas, Texas), NRHP-listed
 Magnolia Hotel (Denver, Colorado), NRHP-listed
 Magnolia Hotel (Houston)
 Magnolia Hotel (Omaha)
 Magnolia Hotel (Seguin, Texas)

See also
Magnolia Hall (disambiguation)